Gordon Hampson (born February 13, 1959 in Vancouver, British Columbia) is a former National Hockey League player for the Calgary Flames.

His father, Ted Hampson, also played in the NHL, and in the WHA. He attended Edina High School in Edina, Minnesota, while his father was playing for the Minnesota Fighting Saints.

He played his college hockey at the University of Michigan. After a successful 4 years there he signed with the Flames. Although at the time few college players made the NHL he was one of them when he played four games in the 1982–83 season.

External links

1959 births
Living people
Calgary Flames players
Canadian ice hockey forwards
Michigan Wolverines men's ice hockey players
Ice hockey people from Vancouver
Undrafted National Hockey League players
Edina High School alumni